Stefan Nikolić (born 16 April 1990) is a Montenegrin professional footballer who plays as a striker for Italian club Bisceglie.

Club career

Youth career
Born in Nikšić, Nikolić began his youth career with local club Sutjeska. Later, he joined the Serbian club Partizan for one year. In 2005, Nikolić signed with OFK Beograd and after two years he was promoted to the first team.

OFK Beograd
Nikolić made his professional debut in Serbia for OFK Beograd where he made just three appearances in the Serbian SuperLiga.

Lierse
On 16 May 2008, he signed with Belgian side Lierse making 23 appearances for the Belgian team, scoring 4 goals. In the 2009–10 season, he was sent on loan to Roeselare, where he played 20 matches and even scored two goals.

Politehnica Timișoara
On 7 September 2010, Nikolić signed with Politehnica Timișoara for an undisclosed fee. He signed a five-year contract. He made his Liga I debut on 2 October 2010, in a 2–1 win against Rapid Bucharest. On 21 November 2010, Nikolić scored his first goal for Poli in 2–0 win against Oţelul Galaţi. He finished the 2010–11 season with 18 appearances and three goals.

Steaua București
On 25 July 2011, Nikolić signed with Romanian record champion Steaua București for an initial fee of €250,000 and a buy-out clause of €750,000 for the rest of the players rights which was activated in the summer of 2012. He scored his first goal for Steaua against Oțelul Galați. On 14 December 2011, he scored 2 goals against AEK Larnaca in the Europa League.

At the end of 2013, Nikolić was released by Steaua București.

Incheon United
In January 2014, Nikolić received an offer to join the K League Classic team Incheon United in South Korea.

CSKA Sofia
On 13 January 2015, Nikolić signed a one-and-a-half-year contract with Bulgarian A Football Group side CSKA Sofia.

Italy
On 4 November 2021, he signed with Bisceglie in the Italian fourth-tier Serie D after starting the 2021–22 season with San Luca in the same league.

International career
He was part of the Montenegro national under-19 football team and the Montenegro national under-21 football team.

In September 2012, Nikolić was called up to the Montenegrin senior side for two matches against Poland and San Marino, but failed to make the final squad.

Career statistics

Club

Honours
Steaua București:
Romanian Liga I: 2012–13, 2013–14
Romanian Supercup: 2013

References

External links
 
 
 
 Stefan Nikolić at VocketFC

1990 births
Living people
Footballers from Nikšić
Association football forwards
Montenegrin footballers
Montenegro youth international footballers
Montenegro under-21 international footballers
OFK Beograd players
Lierse S.K. players
K.S.V. Roeselare players
FC Politehnica Timișoara players
FC Steaua București players
Incheon United FC players
PFC CSKA Sofia players
NK Istra 1961 players
Bruk-Bet Termalica Nieciecza players
FK Radnik Surdulica players
FC Kaisar players
Sepsi OSK Sfântu Gheorghe players
FK Napredak Kruševac players
FK Sutjeska Nikšić players
FK Krupa players
Melaka United F.C. players
A.S. Bisceglie Calcio 1913 players
Serbian SuperLiga players
Challenger Pro League players
Belgian Pro League players
Liga I players
K League 1 players
First Professional Football League (Bulgaria) players
Croatian Football League players
Ekstraklasa players
Kazakhstan Premier League players
Montenegrin First League players
Premier League of Bosnia and Herzegovina players
Malaysia Super League players
Serie D players
Montenegrin expatriate footballers
Expatriate footballers in Serbia
Montenegrin expatriate sportspeople in Serbia
Expatriate footballers in Belgium
Montenegrin expatriate sportspeople in Belgium
Expatriate footballers in Romania
Montenegrin expatriate sportspeople in Romania
Expatriate footballers in South Korea
Montenegrin expatriate sportspeople in South Korea
Expatriate footballers in Bulgaria
Montenegrin expatriate sportspeople in Bulgaria
Expatriate footballers in Croatia
Montenegrin expatriate sportspeople in Croatia
Expatriate footballers in Poland
Montenegrin expatriate sportspeople in Poland
Expatriate footballers in Kazakhstan
Montenegrin expatriate sportspeople in Kazakhstan
Expatriate footballers in Bosnia and Herzegovina
Montenegrin expatriate sportspeople in Bosnia and Herzegovina
Expatriate footballers in Malaysia
Montenegrin expatriate sportspeople in Malaysia
Expatriate footballers in Italy
Montenegrin expatriate sportspeople in Italy